Abdur Rahmān Momand (1632–1706) or Rahmān Bābā, was a renowned Pashtun Sufi Dervish and poet from Momand Agency in Peshawar during the Mughal era. He, along with his contemporary Khushal Khan Khattak, is considered to be one of the most popular poets among the ethnic Pashtuns. His poetry expresses the mystical side of Islam, in line with his Sufi-oriented nature.

Rahman's lineage 
Rahman Baba was a Momand sub-tribe of the Ghoryakhel Pashtuns. Rahman apparently lived peacefully in the area, and never mentions his involvement in the fierce intertribal conflicts of his day.

Opinion is divided about Rahman's family background. Several commentators are convinced that his family was village Malik (chieftains). However, Rahman Baba was more likely to have been a simple, though learned man. As he himself claimed: "Though the wealthy drink water from a golden cup, I prefer this clay bowl of mine."

Abdur Rahman Baba died in 1715 CE, and his tomb is housed in a large domed shrine, or mazar, on the southern outskirts of Peshawar (Ring Road Hazar Khwani). The site of his grave is a popular place for poets and mystics to collect to recite his popular poetry. In April each year, there is a larger gathering to celebrate his anniversary.

Religious background 
Rahman Baba was a pure Hanafi

Published work 
A collection of Rahman's poetry, called the Dīwān ("anthology") of Rahman Baba, contains 343 poems, most of which are written in his native Pashto. The Dīwān of Rahman Baba was in wide circulation by 1728. There are over 25 original hand-written manuscripts of the Dīwān scattered in various libraries worldwide, including ten in the Pashto Academy in Peshawar, four in the British Library, three in the Bibliothèque Nationale in Paris, as well as copies in the John Rylands Library in Manchester, the Bodleian Library in Oxford and the University Library Aligath. The first printed version was collected by the Anglican Missionary T.P. Hughes and printed in Lahore in 1877. It is this version which remains the most commonly used to this day.

Reputation 
"Rahman Baba has received a large amount of praise. His work is regarded by many Pashtuns to be far more than poetry and next only to the Quran."

Selected verses from Rahman Baba's Diwan translated into English rhyme 
About 111 verses were translated into English Rhyme and published by Arbab Hidayatullah, himself a Ghoryakhel Momand, in 2009. The original Pashto version has been transliterated into the Roman alphabet in order to make it easier to read for those who can not read the Pashto alphabet. This translation, with a tilt to the romantic side of Rahman Baba's poetry, has been very well received.

Shrine
After his demise, poets, musicians and singers flocked to his gravesite annually. This annual congregation attained a festive status over the years which has carried on as part of Peshawar's rich cultural tradition to this day.
However, on 5 March 2009, "militants" bombed Rahman Baba's tomb in Peshawar. "The high intensity device almost destroyed the grave, gates of a mosque, canteen and conference hall situated in the Rehman Baba Complex. Police said the bombers had tied explosives around the pillars of the tombs, to pull down the mausoleum". The shrine reopened in November 2012 after Rs. 39m reconstruction.

Urs Mubarak
Every year on 4 April people from different part of Pakistan and Afghanistan visit Shrine of Rehman Baba to celebrate Urs Mubarak.

Recommended reading 

 H. G. Raverty, The Gulistan-i-Roh: Afghan Poetry and Prose
 H. G. Raverty, Selections from the Poetry of the Afghans, from the 16th to the 19th Century
 Abdur Rahman Baba, Robert Sampson, and Momin Khan. The Poetry of Rahman Baba: Poet of the Pukhtuns. Translated by Robert Sampson and Momin Khan. Peshawar: University Book Agency, 2005.
 Robert Sampson. "The Poetry of Rahman Baba: The Gentle Side of Pushtun Consciousness." Central Asia 52 (2003): 213–228.
 Robert Sampson and Momin Khan. Sow Flowers: Selections from Rahman Baba, the Poet of the Afghans. Peshawar: Interlit Foundation, 2008.
 Robert Sampson. "The War on Poetry: Snuffing out Folk Tradition Along the Pakistan-Afghan Border." The Frontier Post, 7 December 2008.
 Abdur Raḥmān Baba, Jens Enevoldsen, "The Nightingale of Peshawar: Selections from Rahman Baba." Interlit Foundation, 1993.
 Abdur Raḥmān Baba. "Rahman Baba: A Few Verses from His Deewan." Translated into English Rhyme by Hidayatullah Muhibkhel Arbab Mohmand.

See also 
 Khushal Khan Khattak
 Abdul Ghani Khan
 Ameer Hamza Shinwari

References

External links 
 Rehman Baba biography
 
 The Life of Rahman Baba
 Biography and Information
 
 Mohammad Zarin Anzor about the life and works of Rahman Baba
 Interlit Foundation

 Diwan of Rahman Baba
 The Afghan Pashto Poet Rahman Baba: Philosopher and Poet of the Heart

Pashto-language poets
Pashtun people
Sufi mystics
Sufism in Pakistan
Sufism in Afghanistan
People from Peshawar
1653 births
1711 deaths
Pashtun Sufis
Pashtun tribes